Dogiel cells, also known as cells of Dogiel, refers to a type of multipolar neuronal cells within the prevertebral sympathetic ganglia. They are named after the Russian anatomist and physiologist Alexandre Dogiel (1852–1922). Dogiel cells play a role in the enteric nervous system.

Types
There are seven types of cells of Dogiel.

References

Further reading
 
 
 
 

Sympathetic nervous system
Enteric nervous system